Zambeccari is an Italian surname. Notable people with the surname include:

 Count Francesco Zambeccari (1752–1812), Italian aviator
 Giuseppe Zambeccari (1655–1728), Italian physician and anatomist
 Pompeo Zambeccari (1518–1571), Italian clergyman

Italian-language surnames